Pennine Spring is a brand of mineral water owned by Britvic that comes from the Yorkshire Pennines, in the United Kingdom.

Established in 1871, Pennine Spring was produced by Ben Shaws of Huddersfield. In 2004, Britvic bought the brand and the Ben Shaws site. Pennine Spring is available as still and sparkling water and in Orange and Peach & Strawberry and Citrus flavours.

External links 
Britvic Site

Bottled water brands